Sociosa nesima is a species of moth of the family Tortricidae that is endemic to Nepal.

The ground colour of the forewings of the males is brownish cream with brownish suffusions, strigulation and dots. The markings are brown. The hindwings are greyish brown. The ground colour of the females is paler and the markings are browner and better developed.

Etymology
The species name refers to the type locality.

References

External links

Moths described in 2012
Endemic fauna of Nepal
Polyorthini
Moths of Asia
Taxa named by Józef Razowski